Duncan Sheik (born November 18, 1969) is an American singer-songwriter and composer. Sheik is known for his 1996 debut single "Barely Breathing", which earned him a Grammy Award nomination for Best Male Pop Vocal Performance. He has composed music for motion pictures and Broadway musicals, winning the 2006 Tony Awards for Best Original Score and Best Orchestrations for his work on the musical Spring Awakening.

Early life
Sheik is a native of Montclair, New Jersey. Following his parents' divorce, he split time between his father's house in New Jersey and his mother's home in South Carolina. He is the half-brother of Broadway actress Kacie Sheik. Sheik's Juilliard-trained grandmother introduced him to the piano, and he later took up the electric guitar. By age 12, he was playing guitar with high school students in a cover band. After graduating from Phillips Academy, Andover in 1988, Sheik studied semiotics at Brown University; while at Brown, he played guitar in a band with fellow Brown student Lisa Loeb. Following his graduation from Brown in 1992, he moved to Los Angeles.

Career
Early in his musical career, Sheik played guitar for other artists, including Liz and Lisa (with Elizabeth Mitchell and Lisa Loeb). Sheik also played on His Boy Elroy's 1993 album through his connections from a fellow Brown alum, Tracee Ellis Ross.

Singer-songwriter
In 1996, Sheik released his self-titled debut album, which was certified gold. The album featured the hit single "Barely Breathing", which peaked at number 16 and remained on the Billboard Hot 100 for 55 consecutive weeks. "Barely Breathing" also enjoyed Top 20 success on Adult Contemporary radio, reached No. 2 on the Adult Top 40 charts, and garnered Sheik a Grammy Award nomination for Best Male Pop Vocal Performance.

In 1998, Sheik recorded "Embraceable You" for Red Hot + Rhapsody, a George Gershwin tribute to increase AIDS awareness, and also recorded "Songbird" for another tribute, Legacy: A Tribute to Fleetwood Mac's Rumours. Also in 1998, Sheik released Humming, an experimental follow-up with string arrangements.

Sheik sang a duet with singer Howard Jones on Jones' 2000 single entitled Someone You Need.

Sheik released Phantom Moon, a Nick Drake-influenced album on which he collaborated with poet and writer Steven Sater, in 2001. The following year, Sheik released Daylight, a brighter, more modern-sounding album which included the singles, "On A High" and "Half-Life". After a four-year recording break, Sheik released White Limousine (2006), an album which included companion software on a DVD-ROM to remix individual tracks. In 2008, Sheik was a judge at the 7th annual Independent Music Awards.

In 2009 he released Whisper House, a concept album which provided the score for the musical of the same name. The stage musical premiered at The Old Globe Theatre in San Diego in January 2010, after a workshop at Vassar College, produced by New York Stage and Film in 2009.

In 2011, Sheik released Covers 80's, an album including covers of popular 1980s songs. Concert dates in support of the album were later canceled due to Sheik seeking treatment for alcohol addiction. A remixed version of the album was released the following year. Sheik released a new studio album entitled Legerdemain in October 2015.

Composer
In addition to being a singer-songwriter, Sheik has also composed music for plays, musicals, and movie soundtracks. He composed original music for the 2002 New York Shakespeare Festival production of Twelfth Night.

In 2004, he composed the score for the film A Home at the End of the World. The AllMusic reviewer wrote: "...takes the sensitivity and tension of the film's plot and crafts incidental music and new songs that complement the movie well." He composed the score for the 2005 film Through the Fire with Pete Miser.

Sheik wrote the music for Spring Awakening (2006) in collaboration with Steven Sater. Written over a period of eight years, the musical, which premiered off-Broadway during the summer, opened on Broadway to critical acclaim later in the fall. The musical was based on the controversial German expressionist play The Awakening of Spring, written by Frank Wedekind. Sheik won the 2006 Tony Award for Best Orchestrations for his work on Spring Awakening, and he and Sater won a Tony Award for Best Original Score. In addition, Spring Awakening won the Tony Award for Best Musical and a Grammy Award for Best Musical Show Album. The guitar that Sheik used to compose songs for Spring Awakening was displayed at the New York Public Library for the Performing Arts at Lincoln Center. As of 2012, Sheik was composing music for a feature-film adaptation of Spring Awakening, an adaptation almost a decade in the making.

In 2012, Sheik wrote Alice By Heart, an adaptation of Lewis Carroll's Alice's Adventures in Wonderland, along with collaborator Sater. Directed by Jessie Nelson with musical direction by Lance Horne, the musical was workshopped at the Royal National Theatre and commissioned by the National Theatre Connections.

Sheik wrote the music and lyrics to the 2013 musical adaptation of American Psycho, which opened at the Almeida Theatre in London, and was later staged on Broadway in 2016.

In 2013, Sheik wrote the music for the musical adaptation of the novel Because of Winn-Dixie, which premiered at the Arkansas Repertory Theatre. Dixie was a collaboration with then-director John Tartaglia and Nell Benjamin, who wrote the book and lyrics. The musical ran at the Goodspeed Opera House, East Haddam, Connecticut from July 2019 to September 2019, directed by John Rando.

In 2015, Sheik wrote the musical thriller Noir with Kyle Jarrow. It premiered as part of New York Stage and Film's season in July to August 2015 at the Powerhouse Theater at Vassar College. Inspired by live radio plays and classic film noir, the musical was directed by Rachel Chavkin.

In 2016 he prepared the music for the Shakespeare Theatre Company (Washington, D.C.) production of The Taming of the Shrew, described in The Washington Post as "an assortment of preexisting songs by singer-songwriter Duncan Sheik".

Other work
Sheik produced singer-songwriter Micah Green's 2000 debut album as well as his 2012 follow-up.

In 2000, Sheik wrote the foreword to The Way of Youth: Buddhist Common Sense for Handling Life's Questions, by Soka Gakkai International leader Daisaku Ikeda.

In 2006, Sheik recorded the song "A Purple Trail" for Other Songs and Dances, Vol. 1. In 2008, Sheik participated in Songs for Tibet: The Art of Peace, an initiative to support Tibet, Dalai Lama, and Tenzin Gyatso.

Personal life
Concert dates in support of Sheik's 2011 album Covers 80's were canceled when Sheik sought treatment for alcohol addiction. In a message to fans on his tumblr blog, Sheik noted that he had entered a treatment center on the same day his latest album was released and had told his staff, "My record is coming out and I’m checking in."

Sheik has a daughter, Ines, with his wife, model Nora Ariffin.

Sheik practices Nichiren Buddhism and is a member of the US branch of the worldwide Buddhist association Soka Gakkai International.

Awards and nominations
{| class=wikitable
|-
! Year !! Awards !! Work !! Category !! Result
|-
| rowspan=2|1997
| rowspan=2|Billboard Music Awards
| Himself
| Top Adult Top 40 Artist
| 
|-
| rowspan=3| "Barely Breathing"
| Top Adult Top 40 Track
| 
|-
| 1998
| Grammy Awards
| Best Male Pop Vocal Performance
| 
|-
| 1999
| BMI Pop Awards
| Award-Winning Song
| 
|-
| rowspan=4|2007
| rowspan=2|Tony Awards
| rowspan=5|Spring Awakening
| Best Original Score
| 
|-
| Best Orchestrations
| 
|-
| rowspan=2|Drama Desk Awards
| Outstanding Music
| 
|-
| Outstanding Orchestrations
| 
|-
| 2008
| Grammy Awards
| Best Musical Show Album
| 
|-
| 2016
| Outer Critics Circle Awards
| American Psycho
| Outstanding New Score
|

Discography

Albums

Studio albums

Live albums

Remix albums

Compilation albums

Extended plays

Singles
{| class="wikitable plainrowheaders" style="text-align:center;"
|-
! rowspan="2"| Year
! rowspan="2" style="width:12em;"| Single
! colspan="6"| Peak chart positions
! rowspan="2"| Album
|- style="font-size:smaller;"
! style="width:35px;"| CAN
! style="width:35px;"| US
! style="width:35px;"| US AC
! style="width:35px;"| US Adult
! style="width:35px;"| US Dance
! style="width:35px;"| US Pop
|-
| 1996
! scope="row"| "Barely Breathing"
| 12
| 16
| 19
| 2
| —
| 10
| style="text-align:left;" rowspan="3"| Duncan Sheik
|-
| rowspan="3"| 1997
! scope="row"| "She Runs Away"
| —
| —
| —
| 24
| —
| —
|-
! scope="row"| "Reasons for Living"
| —
| —
| —
| —
| 3
| —
|-
! scope="row"| "Wishful Thinking"
| —
| 103
| —
| —
| —
| —
| style="text-align:left;"| Great Expectations (soundtrack)
|-
| 1998
! scope="row"| "Bite Your Tongue"
| —
| —
| —
| —
| —
| —
| style="text-align:left;" rowspan="2"| Humming
|-
| 1999
! scope="row"| "That Says It All"
| —
| —
| —
| —
| —
| —
|-
| 2001
! scope="row"| "A Mirror in the Heart"
| —
| —
| —
| —
| —
| —
| style="text-align:left;"| Phantom Moon
|-
| rowspan="2"| 2002
! scope="row"| "On a High"
| —
| —
| —
| 21
| 1
| —
| style="text-align:left;" rowspan="2"| Daylight
|-
! scope="row"| "Half-Life"
| —
| —
| —
| —
| —
| —
|-
| rowspan="2"| 2005
! scope="row"| "White Limousine"
| —
| —
| —
| —
| —
| —
| style="text-align:left;" rowspan="2"| White Limousine
|-
! scope="row"| "The Dawn's Request"
| —
| —
| —
| —
| —
| —
|-
| 2008
! scope="row"| "We're Here to Tell You"
| —
| —
| —
| —
| —
| —
| style="text-align:left;" rowspan="3"| Whisper House
|-
| rowspan="2"| 2009
! scope="row"| "Earthbound Starlight"
| —
| —
| —
| —
| —
| —
|-
! scope="row"| "Play Your Part"
| —
| —
| —
| —
| —
| —
|-
| 2012
! scope="row"| "Shout"
| —
| —
| —
| —
| —
| —
| style="text-align:left;"| Covers Eighties Remixed
|-
| 2013
! scope="row"| "Lay Down Your Weapons"
| —
| —
| —
| —
| —
| —
| style="text-align:left;" rowspan="3" 
|-
| 2020
! scope="row"| "Barely Breathing 2020 'Dear 45'"
| —
| —
| —
| —
| —
| —
|-
| 2021
! scope="row"| "Better Things For Better Living"
| —
| —
| —
| —
| —
| —
|-
| rowspan="5"|2022
! scope="row"| "Experience"
| —
| —
| —
| —
| —
| —
| rowspan="5"|Claptrap
|-
! scope="row"| "Maybe"
| —
| —
| —
| —
| —
| —
|-
! scope="row"| "Something Happening Here"
| —
| —
| —
| —
| —
| —
|-
! scope="row"| "Chimera II"
| —
| —
| —
| —
| —
| —
|-
! scope="row"| "There's No Telling"
| —
| —
| —
| —
| —
| —
|-
| colspan="10" style="font-size:8pt"| "—" denotes releases that did not chart
|}

Stage creditsTwelfth Night – 2002Nero (Another Golden Rome) – 2006 (San Francisco)Harvey, Dennis (February 26, 2006). "Review. Nero (Another Golden Rome). Variety.Spring Awakening – 2006The Nightingale – 2003, 2005 (workshop) 2006 (based on The Nightingale)Whisper House – 2010 (Old Globe Theatre, San Diego)Carson McCullers Talks About Love (with Suzanne Vega) — 2011 (Off-Broadway)Hetrick, Adam (April 20, 2011). "Suzanne Vega Debuts Carson McCullers Talks About Love Off-Broadway April 20". Playbill.Alice by Heart – 2012American Psycho — 2013The Taming of the Shrew — 2016 (Washington, DC)
 The Secret Life of Bees'' — 2019 (Atlantic Theater Company, New York)

Film and television credits

See also
List of number-one dance hits (United States)
List of artists who reached number one on the US Dance chart

References

External links
 Duncan Sheik official website
 
 
 Rounder Records Group artist page on Duncan Sheik

1969 births
Living people
American Buddhists
Nichiren Buddhists
American alternative rock musicians
American male singer-songwriters
American musical theatre composers
American rock songwriters
American rock singers
Broadway composers and lyricists
Atlantic Records artists
Brown University alumni
Grammy Award winners
Members of Sōka Gakkai
Singer-songwriters from New Jersey
People from Montclair, New Jersey
People from Beaufort, South Carolina
Phillips Academy alumni
Tony Award winners
Alternative rock singers
People from Garrison, New York
20th-century American singers
21st-century American singers
Zoë Records artists
American male pop singers
Art pop musicians
20th-century American male singers
21st-century American male singers
Singer-songwriters from South Carolina
Singer-songwriters from New York (state)